Orilesa is a genus of moths of the family Tortricidae.

Species
Orilesa caminosa Razowski, 2012
Orilesa mediocris (Meyrick, 1914)
Orilesa olearis (Meyrick, 1912)

Etymology
The genus name is an anagram of the name of the type-species, Orilesa olearis.

See also
List of Tortricidae genera

References

External links
tortricidae.com

Archipini
Tortricidae genera